The following is the 1981–82 network television schedule for the three major English language commercial broadcast networks in the United States. The schedule covers primetime hours from September 1981 through August 1982. The schedule is followed by a list per network of returning series, new series, and series cancelled after the 1980–81 season. All times are Eastern and Pacific, with certain exceptions, such as Monday Night Football.

New series are highlighted in bold.

Each of the 30 highest-rated shows is listed with its rank and rating as determined by Nielsen Media Research.

 Yellow indicates the programs in the top 10 for the season.
 Cyan indicates the programs in the top 20 for the season.
 Magenta indicates the programs in the top 30 for the season.

Note: A Writers Guild of America strike hindered the ability to start airing shows in a timely manner. The shows in the schedule were the first to air new episodes in their respective time periods as they premiered between September and early December. The debut month for each new series that had been intended for a fall premiere is noted as to when it actually appeared.

PBS, the Public Broadcasting Service, was in operation but the schedule was set by each local station.

Sunday 

Note : On NBC, The Powers of Matthew Star was supposed to have aired 7-8 p.m., starting December 6, but production difficulties forced its delay into the next season.

Monday

Tuesday 

Note: On ABC, Joanie Loves Chachi premiered March 23, 1982, at 8:30 pm, in place of Laverne & Shirley.  On CBS, Q.E.D. ran for 6 weeks at 8pm, from March 23 to April 27.

Wednesday 

NOTE: The only episode of the sitcom Cass Malloy aired on CBS from 8:30 to 9:00 p.m. Eastern Time on July 21, 1982. Although not picked up as a regular series, it served as the pilot for the 1987–1989 syndicated sitcom She's the Sheriff.

Thursday 

Note: On CBS, Nurse aired at 9-10 p.m. and Knots Landing at 10-11 p.m., both in September and October.  On ABC, Bosom Buddies aired at 9-9:30 p.m. in October.

Friday

Saturday 

(*) Also known as It's a Living.

Note: On ABC, Maggie was replaced by Open All Night, effective November 28; King's Crossing, which was supposed to have aired 8-9 p.m., was delayed until January, 1982, as an indirect result of the Writers Guild of America strike.

By network

ABC

Returning Series
20/20
The ABC Sunday Night Movie
Barney Miller
Benson
Bosom Buddies
Dynasty
Fantasy Island
The Greatest American Hero
Happy Days
Hart to Hart
Making a Living
Laverne & Shirley
The Love Boat
Monday Night Baseball
Monday Night Football
Mork & Mindy
Taxi
That's Incredible!
Three's Company
Too Close for Comfort

New Series
9 to 5 *
Best of the West
Code Red *
Darkroom
The Fall Guy
Joanie Loves Chachi *
King's Crossing *
Maggie
No Soap, Radio *
Open All Night *
The Phoenix *
Police Squad! *
Strike Force
T.J. Hooker *
Today's FBI

Not returning from 1980–81:
240-Robert
Aloha Paradise
Breaking Away
Charlie's Angels
Eight is Enough
Foul Play
I'm a Big Girl Now
Soap
Those Amazing Animals
Vega$

CBS

Returning Series
60 Minutes
Alice
Archie Bunker's Place
Dallas
The Dukes of Hazzard
House Calls
The Incredible Hulk
The Jeffersons
Knots Landing
Lou Grant
M*A*S*H
Magnum, P.I.
Nurse
One Day at a Time
Private Benjamin
Trapper John, M.D.
The Two of Us
Walt Disney (moved from NBC)
WKRP in Cincinnati

New Series
Baker's Dozen *
Cagney & Lacey
Falcon Crest
Filthy Rich *
Herbie, the Love Bug *
Jessica Novak
Making the Grade *
Mr. Merlin
Q.E.D. *
Report to Murphy *
Shannon
Simon & Simon

Not returning from 1980–81:
Checking In
Enos
Flo
Freebie and the Bean
Ladies' Man
Palmerstown, U.S.A.
Park Place
Riker
Secrets of Midland Heights
That's My Line
The Tim Conway Show
Walter Cronkite's Universe
The Waltons
The White Shadow

NBC

Returning Series
Barbara Mandrell and the Mandrell Sisters
CHiPs
Diff'rent Strokes
The Facts of Life
Flamingo Road
Harper Valley
Hill Street Blues
Little House on the Prairie
NBC Magazine
NBC Sunday Night Movie
NBC Monday Night at the Movies
Quincy, M.E.
Real People

New Series
The Billy Crystal Comedy Hour *
Bret Maverick *
Cassie & Co. *
Chicago Story *
Fame *
Father Murphy
Fitz and Bones
Gimme a Break!
Jokebook *
Lewis & Clark *
Love, Sidney
McClain's Law
Nashville Palace
One of the Boys *
The Shape of Things *
Teachers Only *
Television: Inside and Out *

Not returning from 1980–81:
B.J. and the Bear
The Big Event
The Brady Brides
Buck Rogers in the 25th Century
Disney's Wonderful World (moved to CBS)
Games People Play
Lobo
Marie
Nero Wolfe
Number 96
The Steve Allen Comedy Hour
Walking Tall

Note: The * indicates that the program was introduced in midseason.

References 

United States primetime network television schedules
1981 in American television
1982 in American television